Gerwyn Rhys Morgan (9 June 1954 – August 2021) was a Wales international rugby union player. He played his club rugby for Newport and captained the team during the 1987–88 season.

Rugby career
Morgan was born in Southerndown, Bridgend. He first played rugby as a schoolboy and represented Caerleon Comprehensive. As a youth he played for both Newport College of Education and Caerleon R.F.C. before being selected for first class Welsh team, Newport RFC. A product of the Newport Youth system he captained the Youth XV before moving into the senior team in the 1974/75 season. He made an impressive start, putting over 28 penalties, 17 conversions and two tries, finishing the season as the club's top scorer with 126 points. Over the years Morgan gradually relinquished his kicking role to concentrate on his scrummaging duties.

Morgan was selected for invitational touring side, the Barbarians, and also faced two international sides for Newport, the New Zealand All Blacks in 1980 and Fiji in 1985. In 1984 he was selected for his one and only international cap, when he was chosen as a late replacement for the Wales team, to face Scotland as part of the 1984 Five Nations Championship, played at Cardiff Arms Park. Wales lost 9–15.

Morgan was given the captaincy of the Newport senior team for the 1987–88 season and remained at the club until his retirement in 1990. He appeared in three WRU Challenge Cup finals, in 1977, 1978 and 1986. He played in 520 games for Newport, a club record that stood until beaten by David Waters.

Notes

1954 births
2021 deaths
Barbarian F.C. players
Newport RFC players
Rugby union players from Bridgend
Wales international rugby union players
Welsh rugby union players
Rugby union props
Rugby union players from Caerleon
People educated at Caerleon Comprehensive School